The Killiecrankie railway station served the village of Killiecrankie, Perth and Kinross, Scotland from 1864 to 1965.

History 
The station was opened on 1 July 1864 by the Inverness and Perth Junction Railway (I&PJn).

On 28 June 1865 the I&PJn amalgamated with the Inverness and Aberdeen Junction Railway to form the Highland Railway.

The goods yard was situated south of the line and was able to handle most types of goods including live stock.

On Saturday 13 February 1915 the 8.40am express train from Inverness to Perth derailed at the south end of Killiecrankie station. Three vehicles left the rails close to the River Garry which runs fifty feet below the railway embankment. A fourth vehicle left the rails in the middle of the tunnel, 200 yards further on but remained upright. The accident was attributed to one wagon having left the rails passing Blair Atholl, thus fouling the points at Killiecrankie North. The forward part of the train continued to Perth, but the line was blocked for 12 hours.

There were two signal boxes: the north box was on the south side of the line and the south box was opposite the goods yard; these boxes closed 1920 and 1963 respectively. A camping coach was positioned here by the Scottish Region from 1962 to 1963.

Stationmasters

Donald Mackenzie from 1877
F.R. Yeates from 1879
James A. Riach 1882 - 1884 (afterwards station master at Lenzie)
John Fraser 1889 - 1890
Mr. Craig until 1894 (afterwards station master at Hopeman)
Mr. Macbeath from 1894
William McKay ca. 1899 - 1914 (afterwards station master at Alves)
Arthur C. Ross 1914 - 1931 (afterwards station master at Kildary)
George Petrie from 1944

References

External links
 

Disused railway stations in Perth and Kinross
Railway stations in Great Britain opened in 1864
Railway stations in Great Britain closed in 1965
Beeching closures in Scotland
Former Highland Railway stations
1864 establishments in Scotland
1965 disestablishments in Scotland